United Nations Security Council Resolution 394, adopted unanimously on August 16, 1976, after examining the application of the Republic of the Seychelles for membership in the United Nations, the Council recommended to the General Assembly that the Seychelles be admitted.

See also
 List of United Nations Security Council Resolutions 301 to 400 (1971–1976)

References
Text of the Resolution at undocs.org

External links
 

 0394
 0394
 0394
August 1976 events
1976 in Seychelles